The Stolen Princess is a 2018 Ukrainian 3D animated fantasy film directed by Oleg Malamuzh and based on the fairy tale Ruslan and Ludmila by Russian poet Aleksandr Pushkin. The film premiere in Ukraine took place on March 7, 2018.

The film tells about a wandering artist Ruslan who saves princess Mila kidnapped by evil sorcerer named Chornomor.

Cast

In Ukrainian version, the roles were dubbed by:

Plot

Two sorcerers, Finn and Shernomore, have an intense magical duel in favor of saving Finn's beloved wife, Princess Nina. Finn gains the upper hand at first but is defeated by Shernomore, who deceives him by stepping on a "force field", and loses all of his magic powers and youth, which then transfers to Shernomore. Nina is transformed into a stone statue in exchange for her power of love as a source of his magic.

In the present day, Ruslan, a wandering artist who dreams of becoming a knight, is doing a small play written by an eccentric and an aspiring playwright, Lester, in which he plays the role of Finn and Shernomore. In the castle lives an adventurous and kind princess named Mila. She is bored with her life and her overprotective father, King Vladimir, is forcing her to get married, despite her longing to explore the world and have adventures. One night, she sneaks out and is almost harassed by two gangsters, until Ruslan arrives. He saves Mila from the men and they escape. When the two are alone, Ruslan, afraid of being judged by his status, claims to be a knight.

The next day, they share romantic moments as they develop their feelings for each other. Unfortunately, much to Ruslan's surprise and horror, Mila is kidnapped via a tornado by Shernomore, He tries to pursue Mila, but fails to do so and is knocked unconscious. When he regains consciousness, he is confronted by the king, who mistakenly accuses him of abducting his daughter. Ruslan tries to tell the truth, but none one believes him. Realising Shernomore is real, he consults Lester and they set off to the cave where a wise cat lives. The cat tells Ruslan that every century, Shernomore abducts a princess who is in love and uses the power of her love to replenish his magical powers. Many have set out to defeat him, but all have perished.

The two ask for help on where to find Mila so he reveals to them a magic vortex where they discover a magical place and he gives them a pea pod as a "gift". When they reached a cliff, a hamster suddenly steals the pod and they pursue it. But they realise that they are supposed to give it to him and unlock a bridge built from a dragon's skeleton.

Meanwhile, at Shernomore's castle, Mila awakens in a bed and encounters Shernomore, who informs her of his plans to turn her to stone once he has made use of her love for Ruslan. She tries to escape using the wizard's magical hat that makes the user invisible. Despite Shernomore casting a spell that makes all of the desserts in his castle come alive and attack Mila, she manages to defeat them. Whilst avoiding Shernomore, she discovers the other princesses who were kidnapped by him, and turned into stone.

When Ruslan and Lester arrive at the cave, they meet a strange old man who holds a staff similar to a wizard, and ask for help on where to find Finn. However, the old man reveals he is Finn. But due to him having no contact with the outside world for too long, he is too paranoid to communicate with. With the help of Ruslan's plan, they pretend to be "wizards" who are casting a "spell" to lure him down. Finn, believing that his powers are restored, tries to stop them. Ruslan and the gang pretend to be dead, only for them to contain Finn. When they get him, Ruslan asks where to find Shernomore and how to stop him, Finn tells them that his castle is made of spiky rocks and the source of his power is in his beard, asking him to cut it off, but no one was able to do that. And he tells Ruslan that he needs a magic sword in order to do that. After asking for the directions on where to find the sword, they locate it but it is guarded by an army of skeletons and the animated head of a decapitated giant. The giant challenges Ruslan in exchange for the armor and sword, but Ruslan manages to defeat all of them and they go to Shernomore's castle.

When they get to the castle, they split up to find Mila. Ruslan finds Mila in a different outfit and appearance and she tells him that she does not need rescuing, for she is happy at this place. This breaks Ruslan's heart. Feeling down, he slowly leaves the place. Suddenly, a giant monster attacks them.  Lester tries to convince Ruslan to fight, but he's too heartbroken to do so. Their bird gets Mila's pendant and makes Ruslan realise that he is being deceived by Shernomore and he gains the courage to fight the monster.

After defeating the monster, they go to the place where Mila is kept and Ruslan and Shernomore, who transforms into a dragon, engage in an intense duel. Ruslan is defeated at first, but manages to incapacitate Shernomore by cutting his beard. Shernomore loses his powers and the stone statues and Finn turn back to normal. Ruslan tries to escape with Mila, but they are trapped in the force field the same way as Finn did before. Ruslan sacrifices himself by pushing Mila out of the trap, leaving him incapacitated. Mila and Lester tries to save him, but is interrupted by the three knights, resulting in Ruslan's soul being zapped from him and leaving him lifeless. Enraged, Mila fights the three knights and defeats them all (including Shernomore who is tied up).

Mila mourns for the apparent death of Ruslan and says that she loves him so much. A now-rejuvenated Finn appears and brings back Ruslan's life. The two reunite including Lester and Finn and Nina reunite as well. Ruslan confesses that he is not a real knight, but Mila accepts this. She tells him she still loves him no matter what and they share their first kiss. Finn conjures up a fireworks display, and they all live happily ever after.

During the credits, Ruslan and Mila are getting married and are now living a happy life.

Budget

The film is co-financed by Ukrainian State Film Agency: its share is 19.5 million UAH (total production cost of the film is 95.2 million UAH).

Production

On January 30, 2013, producer Egor Olesov informed about the development of Ruslan and Lyudmila project based on a fairy tale poem with the same title by Aleksandr Pushkin. In September 2013, press service of FILM.UA Group announced the start of film production, and later the protagonists and synopsis for Ruslan and Lyudmila were presented with the film itself announced as 2D animation; later, however, the concept changed, and a decision was made to create a 3D animated film.

Hollywood consultants helped with developing the characters. According to the authors of the film, Ruslan and Lyudmila was made in English and then dubbed in Ukrainian. As Olesov says, Hollywood celebrities will be involved in English dubbing, and in Ukraine, popular local actors will lend their voices to the film. For the international market, the film was given another title, The Stolen Princess.

In December 2015, the script and characters’ stories were finalized; animation of approved scenes was completed.

Release

International Distribution 

The Stolen Princess became the first project in the line of theatrically animated premieres from Animagrad, which also includes Mavka. The Forest Song (2018), Snow Republic (2019), and Roksolana and Suleiman (2021). According to the company director, Animagrad plans to release one animated feature per year, both for local Ukrainian and international distribution.

In February 2015 at the European film market during Berlin International Film Festival, the rights to film distribution were sold to Israel and South Korea; in May 2016 at Marché du Film of Cannes International Film Festival, to France, French-speaking territories, Bulgaria, Iran, and Poland. On December 10, 2016, The Hollywood Reporter informed that the film after its presentation a month before at the American film market was sold to China, Germany, Austria, Switzerland, Lithuania, Latvia, Estonia, North Africa, and the Middle East. It was also announced that sales to some other territories were pending.

On March 13–16, 2017 in Hong Kong, FILMART took place, which is an annual film and TV content market. The FILM.UA Group stand presented projects of Animagrad studio, including The Stolen Princess. On the penultimate day of the market, the scenes from the animated film were screened in Asia for the first time; the invitation to the premiere appeared on the cover of The Hollywood Reporter, and the screening itself was successful and gathered positive feedback from market participants. In early April, Cannes hosted MIPTV (Marché International des Programmes de Télévision), a major European market of audiovisual content. The stand of Ukrainian delegation presented, among others, The Stolen Princess film. On May 19 and 23, 2017 the biggest film market Marche du Film under the aegis of the 70th Cannes International Film Festival held market screenings of The Stolen Princess, which enjoyed considerable success: the project gathered countless positive reviews, and negotiations on rights sales for the new territories began.

Immediately after Ukrainian release, the theatrical release took place in Romania (March 16) and Turkey (March 23). During the first Romanian weekend, Ukrainian animated feature film collected $165,066 in the box office and placed second after American blockbuster Lara Croft: Tomb Raider (Metro-Goldwyn-Mayer). It is interesting to compare the film with the main animated releases of 2017–2018 from Hollywood majors such as Disney Pixar, DreamWorks Animation, and Blue Sky Studios, which also took place in Romania: the box office of Ukrainian Princess during the first weekend exceeded those of Coco, Ferdinand the Bull, and Baby Boss, ceding only to the third movie of Cars franchise. The premiere box office of the Ukrainian film places it third among animated releases in Turkey in 2018.

As of April 13, The Stolen Princess is now shown in the cinemas of Ukraine, Romania, Turkey, Croatia, Bosnia and Herzegovina, Bulgaria, Egypt, United Arab Emirates, Kuwait, Lebanon, Jordan, Qatar, Oman and Bahrain. In total, the rights to the animated film screening have been sold to more than 50 countries, including France, Germany, countries of the Middle East, Southern Africa, Asia, and Latin America. In November 2018 Ukrainian media reported that the film had been shown in more than 40 countries with more than half a million viewers. In January 2019 the film will become the first Ukrainian film to be commercially released to cinemas in China.

Distribution in Ukraine

In late December 2016 it was announced that the film will change its title from Ruslan and Lyudmila to The Stolen Princess for its Ukrainian release as well (before that, in February 2016 the film producers already informed that they will use The Stolen Princess, not Ruslan and Lyudmila as the title for international distribution). In October 2017 it became known that film producers changed the title of the film for Ukrainian release again, to The Stolen Princess: Ruslan and Lyudmila. The date of Ukrainian release, March 7, 2018, also became known.
On December 15, 2015, in the framework of winter film market of Odessa International Film Festival Novyi TV channel acquired the rights to TV broadcast of the film. According to the deal, the TV premiere of the film is scheduled in six months after the start of its theatrical release.

Soundtrack
The theme song of the film "Do zirok" ("To the Stars") was performed by Vremya i Steklo band. On February 14, a music video for the song was presented. The author of the Ukrainian lyrics is Oleksandra Ruban, the arrangement to the song was made by Milos Jelic, keyboard player in Okean Elzy band, and the instrumental part was performed by the musicians of Kyiv Virtuosos orchestra. 

The final song in the end credits to the feature film, "Ty Lyubov Moya" ("You're My Love"), was performed by Jamala.

Box office
During the first weekend in Ukraine, the film collected 21 million UAH ($0.8 million) in its box office. During five weekends, the film collected 35,857,041 UAH and hit a record among films produced in Ukraine. Top 5 highest-earning Ukrainian films of all time.

Reviews
The film got mixed reviews. The audience noted the lack of Ukrainian flavor and blind copying of Hollywood standards, inappropriate references to current reality, and lack of charisma among certain characters. However, the reviewers have also praised high animation standards, clever jokes, and the animated feature film appealing to topics of interest to both adults and children.

References

External links 
 
 
  Stolen Princess: Ruslan and Lyudmila  on the site  Animagrad
 "The stolen princess: Ruslan and Lyudmila" on the site  Film.ua
 
 

2018 films
2018 computer-animated films
Ukrainian animated films
Ukrainian animated fantasy films
Films set in Ukraine
Films based on fairy tales
2010s English-language films